GSMR may refer to:

Great Smoky Mountains Railroad reporting mark
GSM-R, railway communication system